Pieces is the eleventh studio album by American singer-songwriter Bobby Womack. The album was released in 1978, by Columbia Records.

Track listing

Personnel
Bobby Womack - guitar, vocals
Eddie Willis, Glen Goins, Jimmy Johnson - guitar
Aaron Willis, Anthony Willis - guitar, bass
Bruce Nazarian - guitar, ARP synthesizer
David Hood, Michael Henderson - bass
Barry Beckett - keyboards
Rudy Robinson - keyboards, synthesizer, clavinet, vibraphone 
Dwayne Lomax, Roger Hawkins - drums
Barbara Huby, Larry Fratangelo - percussion
Kerry Campbell - saxophone
Candi Staton - vocals on "Trust Your Heart" and "Stop Before We Start"
Brandye, David Ruffin - backing vocals
Detroit Horns, Horny Horns - horns
Detroit Symphony Orchestra - strings
David Van De Pitte, Wade Marcus, Fred Wesley, Jeffrey Steinberg, Bernie Worrell, Rudy Robinson - arrangements
Technical
Roger Williams - artwork, design

References

External links
 

1978 albums
Bobby Womack albums
albums arranged by Wade Marcus
Albums produced by Don Davis (record producer)
Columbia Records albums